Valeri "Vako" Qazaishvili (born 29 January 1993) is a Georgian professional footballer who plays as an attacking midfielder for K League 1 club Ulsan Hyundai and the Georgia national team.

Qazaishvili began his career in his native country before moving to Eredivisie side Vitesse in 2011. He spent the 2016–17 season on loan at Legia Warsaw, where he won the Ekstraklasa and played in the UEFA Champions League. He then joined the San Jose Earthquakes of Major League Soccer, where he spent four seasons.

He made his debut for Georgia's national team in 2014.

Club career

Vitesse
Starting his footballing career in his native country, Georgia. Qazaishvili made several appearances for Metalurgi Rustavi and Sioni whilst on loan from Saburtalo Tbilisi before joining Dutch side Vitesse in 2011. After impressing with the Vitesse youth sides, Qazaishvili was given his debut on 27 November 2011, in a 0–0 draw with Twente, starting the fixture before being replaced by Georgian teammate Giorgi Chanturia in the 65th minute. A week later, Qazaishvili scored his first Vitesse goal in a 4–0 victory over RKC Waalwijk, netting in the 21st minute to make it 2–0. In the later years of Qazaishvili's spell with Vitesse, he became a key figure, especially in their 2014–15 and 2015–16 campaigns, netting nineteen times between the two.

Legia Warsaw (loan)
On 31 August 2016, Qazaishvili joined Polish side Legia Warsaw on a season-long loan. On 14 September 2016, Qazaishvili made his Legia Warsaw debut in a 6–0 home defeat against Borussia Dortmund in the opening matchday of the 2016–17 UEFA Champions League. On 1 October 2016, Qazaishvili made his league debut for Legia Warsaw in a 3–0 victory over Lechia Gdańsk, replacing Guilherme in the 76th minute. On 14 May 2017, Qazaishvili scored his first and only goal for Legia Warsaw in their 6–0 home victory over Nieciecza, coming off the bench to seal the win, netting in the 88th minute.

Following the conclusion of the 2016–17 campaign, Qazaishvili returned to Vitesse after appearing sixteen times and scoring once (in all competitions) for Legia Warsaw. After leaving Legia, he stated that he was disappointed with the loan and with Legia coach Jacek Magiera, who Qazaishvili said told him from the very beginning of the loan that he did not have a place with the team. However, he was pleased to have the opportunity to play in the Champions League and alongside players like Nemanja Nikolić, who he would later compete against in MLS.

San Jose Earthquakes
On 22 June 2017, Qazaishvili joined American side San Jose Earthquakes as a Designated Player, the team's youngest ever, after a six-year spell with Vitesse. He was introduced at the club on 10 July 2017, by General Manager Jesse Fioranelli during halftime of San Jose's U.S. Open Cup quarterfinal victory over the LA Galaxy; Georgian basketball player Zaza Pachulia, who was playing for the Golden State Warriors at the time, was present at the ceremony as well. His club debut came in a friendly match four days later on 14 July as a 63rd minute substitution in San Jose's 4–1 defeat of Eintracht Frankfurt. Qazaishvili scored in his MLS debut on 19 July, coming on as a halftime substitution for Danny Hoesen against the New York Red Bulls at Red Bull Arena and scoring San Jose's lone goal of the 5–1 defeat in the 88th minute off of a cross by Jahmir Hyka. He first started for the Earthquakes on 9 August during the team's U.S. Open Cup semifinal loss against Sporting Kansas City, earning an assist on Hoesen's goal and converting his penalty when the game was settled with a penalty shootout. During his first MLS start, at home against the Philadelphia Union on 19 August, Qazaishvili scored his second league goal, assisted by Tommy Thompson.

San Jose declined Qazaishvili's contract option following their 2020 season.

Ulsan Hyundai 
On 16 February 2021, Qazaishvili signed with K League 1 side Ulsan Hyundai.

International career

Qazaishvili has represented Georgia at under-17, under-19 and under-21 levels before making his senior debut in 2014 in 2–0 victory over Liechtenstein, in which he replaced Avtandil Ebralidze at half-time.

Qazaishvili became a regular with the senior squad, and was a part of Georgia's unsuccessful 2018 FIFA World Cup qualification run in 2017. He scored in Georgia's 2–2 draw with Moldova on 11 June, keeping qualification hopes alive, and again in Georgia's 1–1 tie with Ireland on 2 September. He played in the remaining qualifying matches as well, against Austria, Wales, and Serbia, but Georgia ultimately failed to qualify for the 2018 FIFA World Cup.

Personal life
Qazaishvili was born in Ozurgeti, but grew up in the Vake-Saburtalo District of Tbilisi, the Georgian capital. His mother is a Georgian teacher, and his father is a factory engineer; he has a younger brother, Beka, who is eighteen months younger than him. In 2011, Qazaishvili married his wife Gvantsa, whom he met growing up in Saburtalo, and their daughter Emilia was born in 2015. He received his U.S. green card in January 2019, which qualifies him as a domestic player for MLS roster purposes.

Qazaishvili is close friends with Georgia national teammate Guram Kashia, whom he met playing for Vitesse and who joined him in San Jose in 2018. He said of his move to the Netherlands as a teenager that his friendships with Kashia and fellow Georgian teammate at Vitesse Giorgi Chanturia, whom he knew and had played football with from his childhood, helped what was otherwise a difficult move to a new country at a young age.

Qazaishvili is a fan of and influenced by Argentine footballer Lionel Messi and Italian footballer Alessandro del Piero.

Career statistics

Club

International

Scores and results list Georgia's goal tally first.

Honours

Club
Legia Warsaw
 Ekstraklasa: 2016–17

Ulsan Hyundai
 K League 1: 2022

Individual
 K League 1 Best XI: 2021

References

External links

 
 UEFA profile
 Voetbal International profile 
 

1993 births
Living people
Association football midfielders
Ekstraklasa players
Eredivisie players
Erovnuli Liga players
Expatriate footballers in Poland
Expatriate footballers in the Netherlands
Expatriate soccer players in the United States
Expatriate sportspeople from Georgia (country) in Poland
Expatriate sportspeople from Georgia (country) in the Netherlands
FC Metalurgi Rustavi players
Footballers from Georgia (country)
Georgia (country) international footballers
Georgia (country) under-21 international footballers
Legia Warsaw players
People from Ozurgeti
San Jose Earthquakes players
SBV Vitesse players
Major League Soccer players
Designated Players (MLS)